This is list of notable alumni, faculty and staff of the Eastman School of Music.

Alumni

 Martin Amlin, composer and pianist
 Dominick Argento, composer
 Sasami Ashworth, singer
 James Austin, trumpeter and educator
 Angelo Badalamenti, film and television composer
 Nicholson Baker, author
 John Balme, conductor
 Mark Bailey, conductor
 Jeff Beal, composer
 Bob Becker, percussionist and composer
 Frank Bencriscutto, conductor and composer
 Roger Bobo, tubist
 Bonita Boyd, flutist
 Jeff Briggs, video game developer
 Cardon V. Burnham, composer
 Horace Clarence Boyer, scholar
 Rosemarie Brancato, soprano
 Nicole Cabell, soprano
 Ron Carter, jazz musician
 Pamela Coburn (born 1959), soprano
 Alexander Courage, television composer
 Michael Patrick Coyle, composer, trombonist
 Paul Crawford, jazz musician, music historian
 Bill Cunliffe, Grammy Award-winning composer, arranger, jazz pianist 
 Charles Daellenbach, co-founder of Canadian Brass
 David Daniels, conductor and author
 Leonardo De Lorenzo, flautist, the first flute instructor at the Eastman School of Music
 Robert deMaine, cellist
 David Diamond, composer
 Emma Lou Diemer, composer
 Steven Doane, cellist
 Doriot Anthony Dwyer, flautist, first woman named to Principal Chair of a major US orchestra
 Enrico Elisi, pianist
 Bradley Ellingboe, composer, professor
 Katia Escalera, soprano
 Eric Ewazen, composer
 Frederick Fennell, conductor
 John Ferguson, organist, church musician and composer
 David Finck, jazz bassist
 Pamela Fleming, trumpeter, composer
 Renée Fleming, soprano
 Dave Flippo, jazz composer, pianist, vocalist
 Cynthia Folio, flutist, theorist, composer
 Steve Gadd, jazz musician
 Julia Gaines, percussionist
 Crawford Gates, composer, conductor
 Ayşedeniz Gökçin, pianist
 Jonas Gray, bassoonist and digital entrepreneur
 Diana Haskell, clarinetist
 Jon Hassell, composer and improviser
 Christos Hatzis, composer
 Scott Healy, Grammy–nominated composer and keyboardist
 Yoshihisa Hirano, anime composer
 Bernard Hoffer, composer and conductor
 Karen Holvik, soprano
 Katherine Hoover, composer, flutist, educator, author
 Warren Hull, actor and television personality
 Donald Hunsberger, conductor
 Jon Hynes, pianist
 Michael Isaacson, Jewish music composer
 Aaron James, organist
 Guy Johnston, cellist (BBC Young Musician of the Year, 2000)
 Richard Joiner, clarinetist
 Mark Kellogg, trombonist
 Donald Kendrick, choir director, organist
 Chosei Komatsu, conductor
 Gail Kubik, composer
 JoAnn Kuchera-Morin, researcher
 John La Montaine, composer
 Kay Lande, composer and singer
 William P. Latham, composer
 Judith LeClair, bassoonist
 Tony Levin, rock-fusion bassist
 Scott Lindroth, composer
 David Liptak, composer
 Joseph Locke, jazz percussionist
 Michael Lowenstern, clarinetist and bass clarinetist
 Bob Ludwig, mastering engineer
 Eileen Malone, harpist
 Eric Mandat, clarinetist and composer
 Chuck Mangione, jazz musician
 Christopher Martin, trumpet
 Ailbhe McDonagh, cellist and composer
 John McKay, pianist
 Marc Mellits, composer
 Thomas Meglioranza, baritone
 J. Greg Miller, horn player
 Mitch Miller, record producer
 Erin Morley, operatic soprano
 Robert Morris, composer, theorist
 Lee Musiker, arranger
 Gerry Niewood, saxophonist
 Robert Paterson, composer
 Scott Perkins, composer, BMI Student Composer Award Winner
 Jim Pugh, trombonist
 Kevin Puts, composer, 2012 Pulitzer Prize Winner
 Lance Reddick, actor
 Bill Reichenbach Jr., Hollywood trombonist
 Tim Riley, music critic
 Catherine Rodland, organist
 Laurence Rosenthal, Emmy–winning film composer
 Vladimir Rosing, opera director, tenor; founded Opera Department in 1923
 Ralph Sauer, trombonist
 Mark Davis Scatterday, conductor
 Kim Scharnberg, composer, arranger, conductor, record producer
 Maria Schneider, Grammy-winning composer and big band leader
 John Serry Jr., Grammy-nominated jazz pianist and composer
 Christian Sinding, Norwegian composer and teacher at Eastman
 Fenwick Smith, flautist
 SNMNMNM, Indie rock band
 Lew Soloff, trumpeter, composer, actor, Grammy Award for Album of the Year
 D. J. Sparr, composer and electric guitar soloist
 Maurice Stern, tenor
 Leigh Howard Stevens, marimba soloist
 Eileen Strempel, soprano and professor
 Byron Stripling, jazz trumpeter
 Charles Strouse, composer
 Jessica Suchy-Pilalis, harpist, Byzantine singer and composer
 Christopher Theofanidis, composer
 Michael Torke, composer
 Jeff Tyzik, composer and conductor
 Allen Vizzutti, trumpeter
 Mark Volpe, president & CEO, Boston Symphony Orchestra
 George Vosburgh, trumpeter
 Michael Walsh, music critic, novelist and screenwriter
 George Walker, composer
 Leehom Wang, singer-songwriter and record producer
 Robert Ward, opera composer
 William Warfield, baritone
 Claire Watson, soprano
 Helen L. Weiss, composer
 Norma Wendelburg, composer
 Pieter Wispelwey, cellist
 Alec Wilder, composer
 Clifton Williams, composer
 Dana Wilson, composer
 John Williams, composer, conductor, pianist
 Todd Wilson, organist
 Craig M. Wright, Yale professor
 John Wyre, composer and percussionist
 Allen Vizzutti, trumpeter and composer
 Jeffrey Zeigler, cellist

Faculty
The Eastman School has more than 130 faculty members, including internationally renowned performers, composers, conductors, scholars, and educators.  In addition, many highly acclaimed musicians and scholars visit the school each year to give master classes and guest lectures or to serve as visiting faculty members.

Samuel Adler, composition
John H. Beck, percussion
Warren Benson, composition
Bonita Boyd, flute
David Burge, piano
Charles Martin Castleman, violin
Katherine Ciesinski, voice
David Craighead, organ
Robert De Cormier, choral conductor
Jan De Gaetani, voice
Leonardo De Lorenzo, flute
David Effron, orchestral conductor
Frank Glazer, piano
Harold Gleason, organ
Nicholas Goluses, guitar
Anthony Dean Griffey, voice
Arthur Hartmann, violin
Stanley Hasty, clarinet
David Higgs, organ
Donald Hunsberger, wind ensemble conductor
Mark Kellogg, euphonium & trombone
Henry Klumpenhouwer, music theory
Alexander Kobrin, piano
Oleh Krysa, violin
W. Peter Kurau, horn
Ralph P. Locke, musicologist
Eileen Malone, harp
Jon Manasse, clarinet
Chuck Mangione, jazz ensemble
John Marcellus, trombone
Paul O'Dette, lute, early music
Thomas Paul, voice
Emory Remington, trombone
Mendi Rodan, orchestral conductor
Carlos Sanchez-Gutierrez, composition
Joseph Schwantner, composition
, piano
Yi-Kwei Sze, voice
K. David van Hoesen, bassoon
Ruth Taiko Watanabe, music librarian
Marion Weed, voice
Rayburn Wright, jazz and contemporary media
Zvi Zeitlin, violin
Oscar Zimmerman, double bass

References

 
 
Eastman School of Music